Plaisance is a village in Guyana between Better Hope and Goedverwagting. It was purchased by freed slaves from cattle farmer A J Watershodt for $39,000 after the abolition of slavery in 1838. It was officially declared a village in 1892.

Famous people associated with the village include musician brothers Eddy Grant and Rudy Grant, as well as footballer Alex Bunbury who were born there.

References

Further reading
Adams-Haynes, Beryl (2010) Plaisance – From Emancipation to Independence and Beyond

Populated places in Demerara-Mahaica